Alondra Patricia Hidalgo Quintero (born February 17, 1989) is a Mexican actress with 231 voiceovers in Spanish.

Life and career
Alondra Hidalgo began doing voice dubbing at a very young age, although her activity in the field was sporadic until about 1993 when she decided to professionally enter the voiceover business. She is known for having played Hinata Hyuga in the anime series Naruto, Miu Furinji in the anime series Kenichi: The Mightiest Disciple, Molly Cunningham in TaleSpin, Sam Puckett on iCarly and Sam & Cat, and the young lioness Kiara in The Lion King II: Simba's Pride. In 2014 she played the role of Adela in the Mexican thriller film Desierto, directed by Jonas Cuaron.

Filmography

Anime
JoJo's Bizarre Adventure: Stone Ocean (2021-) - Jolyne Cujoh

TV and films
 Crónica de castas (2014) - Lola 
 Desierto (2015) - Adela

References

External links
 

1989 births
Living people
Actresses from Mexico City
Mexican actresses
Mexican voice actresses